Alibayevskoye (Älebay) is a rural locality (a selo) in Ufimsky Selsoviet, Khaybullinsky District, Bashkortostan, Russia. The population was 315 as of 2010. There are 5 streets.

Geography 
Alibayevskoye is located 46 km north of Akyar (the district's administrative centre) by road. Rafikovo is the nearest rural locality.

References 

Rural localities in Khaybullinsky District